United Nations Security Council resolution 1169, adopted unanimously on 27 May 1998, after considering a report by the Secretary-General Kofi Annan regarding the United Nations Disengagement Observer Force (UNDOF), the Council extended its mandate for a further six months until 30 November 1998.

The resolution called upon the parties concerned to immediately implement Resolution 338 (1973) and requested that the Secretary-General submit a report on the situation at the end of that period.

The Secretary-General's report pursuant to the previous resolution on UNDOF said that the situation between Israel and Syria had remained calm though the situation in the Middle East as a whole remained dangerous until a settlement could be reached. Meanwhile, some restrictions by both sides on the freedom of movement of UNDOF were reported.

See also
 Arab–Israeli conflict
 Golan Heights
 Israel–Syria relations
 List of United Nations Security Council Resolutions 1101 to 1200 (1997–1998)

References

External links
 
Text of the Resolution at undocs.org

 1169
 1169
 1169
1998 in Israel
1998 in Syria
May 1998 events